The 2011 St. Petersburg Open was a tennis tournament played on indoor hard courts. It was the 17th edition of the St. Petersburg Open, and part of the ATP World Tour 250 Series of the 2011 ATP World Tour. It took place at the Petersburg Sports and Concert Complex in Saint Petersburg, Russia, from October 24 through October 30, 2011.

ATP entrants

Seeds

* Seeds are based on the rankings of October 17, 2011.

Other entrants
The following players received wildcards into the singles main draw:
  Ernests Gulbis
  Ivan Nedelko
  Dudi Sela

The following players received entry a special exempt into the singles main draw:
  Jérémy Chardy

The following players received entry from the qualifying draw:

  Sergei Bubka
  Teymuraz Gabashvili
  Dušan Lajović
  Vasek Pospisil

Finals

Singles

 Marin Čilić defeated  Janko Tipsarević 6–3, 3–6, 6–2
 It was Čilić's 1st title of the year and 6th of his career.

Doubles

 Colin Fleming /  Ross Hutchins defeated  Michail Elgin /  Alexandre Kudryavtsev 6–3, 6–7(5–7), [10–8]

External links
Official website

St. Petersburg Open
St. Petersburg Open
St. Petersburg Open
St. Petersburg Open